Cerodendra quadripunctata is a moth in the family Zygaenidae. It was described by George Hampson in 1893 from Sri Lanka.

References

Moths described in 1893